Bolyarka is a Bulgarian beer brand from the city of Veliko Tarnovo. The company was founded in 1892 by the HadjiSlavchevi brothers, five years after the first brewery in Tarnovo was founded in 1887 by the German Artur Wilser. During the latter part of the 20th century the beer was called simply Velikotarnovsko pivo, renamed Bolyarka in 2000, in honour of the city's history as the capital of the Second Bulgarian Empire and home of the bolyars.

The company currently has four own brands –
 Bolyarka Light (4.1% ABV)
 Bolyarka Dark (5% ABV)
 Bolyarka Weiss (wheat beer, 5.4% ABV)
 Bolyarka Live (ale)

The company brews several other Bulgarian brands, such as Schweik and Balkansko, and it also imports several brands, including Warsteiner and Kaltenberg.

Gallery

External links 

 boliarka.com – official website

References 

Beer in Bulgaria
Bulgarian brands
Food and drink companies established in 1892
1892 establishments in Bulgaria